Othmar Schimkowitz (2 October 1864 in Tárts, Komárom County – 24 April 1947 in Graz) was a Hungarian-born architectural sculptor who worked on the greatest landmarks of the Vienna Secession.

Life
Schimkowitz studied at the Academy of Fine Arts Vienna, lived for three years in New York as friends with the Austrian-American sculptor Karl Bitter, and returned to Vienna in 1895.  He joined the Vienna Secession in 1898.

Major works
His architectural sculpture includes:
 Figurative ornamentation for the 1897 Gutenberg Monument, Vienna, Jože Plečnik, architect
 The three gorgons on the 1898 Secession exhibition building in Vienna, Joseph Maria Olbrich, architect
 The "calling women"  of the 1898-1899 of the Linke Wienzeile Buildings by Otto Wagner, architect
 Exterior work on the Austrian Pavilion at the 1904 Louisiana Purchase Exposition in St. Louis, Missouri
 Rooftop angels of the 1904-1906 Austrian Postal Savings Bank in Vienna, also for Wagner
 The 1905 Vienna Economic Chamber, Ludwig Baumann, architect
 Angels on the 1907 Kirche am Steinhof in Vienna, also for Wagner

Gallery

See also
Once of Schimkowitz's most prominent design used in a building (The Steinhof Church) was selected as a major motif for one of the most famous euro collectors coins: the Austrian 100 euro Steinhof Church commemorative coin, minted on November 9, 2005. On the reverse of the coin, the Koloman Moser stained glass window over the main entrance can be seen. In the center of the window is God the Father seated on a throne. The window is flanked by a pair of bronze angels in Jugendstil style, originally designed by Othmar Schimkowitz.

References

1864 births
1947 deaths
Austrian sculptors
Austrian male sculptors
Architectural sculptors
Hungarian emigrants to Austria
Academy of Fine Arts Vienna alumni
Art Nouveau sculptors
Hungarian sculptors
Members of the Vienna Secession
20th-century sculptors
19th-century sculptors